The 1973–74 SK Rapid Wien season was the 76th season in club history.

Squad

Squad and statistics

Squad statistics

Fixtures and results

League

Cup

Cup Winners' Cup

References

1973-74 Rapid Wien Season
Rapid